John Newman Dennis (4 January 1913 – 21 August 2006) was an English cricketer.  Dennis was a right-handed batsman.  He was born at Leytonstone, Essex.  He was educated at Forest School, Walthamstow.

Dennis made his first-class debut for Essex against Glamorgan in the 1934 County Championship.  A further first-class appearance came in 1936, while in the following three seasons he made a handful of appearances in each, making a total of 22 appearances between 1934 and 1939.  In his 22 first-class appearances, he scored 530 runs at a batting average of 17.66, with a high score of 53.  This score, which was his only first-class fifty, came against Sussex in 1937.

He died on 21 August 2006.

References

External links
Jack Dennis at ESPNcricinfo
Jack Dennis at CricketArchive

1913 births
2006 deaths
People from Walthamstow
People educated at Forest School, Walthamstow
English cricketers
Essex cricketers